James L. Mitchell (29 September 1834 in Shelby County, Kentucky – 22 February 1894) was an American lawyer, army officer and 11th mayor of the city of Indianapolis, Indiana. Mitchell was born in Kentucky and settled in Indianapolis in 1859 where he read law. During the American Civil War, Mitchell was an officer in the 70th Regiment Indiana Infantry and, near the end of the war, a major on the staff of General Lovell Rousseau. He returned to his law practice following the war (a notable partner at his firm was William A. Ketcham, who later served as Indiana Attorney General) and in 1873 became the first Democratic Party mayor of Indianapolis since Charles G. Coulon twenty-seven years earlier. In fact from 1856 to 1890, Mitchell's two-year term (1873–1875) is the only one not served by a Republican.

References

1834 births
1894 deaths
Mayors of Indianapolis
Indiana Democrats
Union Army officers
19th-century American politicians
American lawyers admitted to the practice of law by reading law